Ali Ahmeti (born 5 January 1959) also known as Abaz Gjuka() is a Macedonian politician of Albanian descent, leader of the Democratic Union for Integration, and a junior coalition partner in the Macedonian government since 2008. Ahmeti is also known as the political leader of the former Albanian National Liberation Army in the 2001 insurgency in Macedonia.

Biography
Ali Ahmeti was born on January 5, 1959, in  Zajas, SR Macedonia,  SFR Yugoslavia. From 1979 to 1983, Ahmeti studied philosophy at the University of Pristina in Kosovo, graduating in 1983. Between 1981 and 1983, he also was one of the student leaders in the 1981 protests in Kosovo. For these activities, Ahmeti was arrested and imprisoned for one year by the Serbian and Yugoslav authorities.

During the years 1984-86 he was involved with reconsolidation of the student movement (and general popular movement) in Kosovo. In 1986, Ahmeti gained political asylum in Switzerland, where he lived until 2001, and was working as a coordinator of different groups.

From 1988-89 he was one of the leaders of the student and miners protests against the Milosevic government. From 1989–90, he was one of the main organizers of protests of the Albanian diaspora in Europe.

Ahmeti gained his recent political support from the National Movement for the Liberation of Kosovo. In the year 1986, he was elected as a member of the Main Council with a specific duty, interconnecting Kosovo with Europe. In the year 1988, he was elected as a member of the leadership of the National Movement of Kosovo. He was re-elected in this position in 1993, with a special duty in the military sector.

In 1996, he was one of the main founders of the Kosovo Liberation Army, and in 1998, when the war started, he was elected member of the main headquarters of the Kosovo Liberation Army. In 2001, he was elected Supreme Commander and political representative of the National Liberation Army (NLA).

After the signing of the Ohrid Agreement in August 2001, and the disarmament of the NLA in September, Ahmeti was engaged in the political process of the implementation of the agreement. In this light, he initiated and was named as a leader of the Coordination Council which unified all Albanian political parties in Macedonia, and the former structures of the NLA.

In June 2002, Ahmeti founded a new political party called the Democratic Union for Integration. In September 2002, DUI won the elections among Albanian parties in the republic and Ahmeti was elected as a deputy in the Macedonian Parliament. DUI entered in coalition with the winning party from the Macedonian block, Social Democratic Union of Macedonia (SDSM). In 2008, DUI entered in coalition with VMRO-DPMNE.

On 26 November 2019, an earthquake struck Albania. Ahmeti was part of a delegation of Albanian politicians from North Macedonia visiting the earthquake epicentre that expressed their condolences to Albanian president Ilir Meta.

In September 2020, Ahmeti testified to prosecutors at the Kosovo Specialist Chambers regarding war crimes in the Kosovo War.

References

1959 births
Living people
People from Kičevo Municipality
Albanians in North Macedonia
Democratic Union for Integration politicians
2001 insurgency in Macedonia
Macedonian Muslims
20th-century Albanian politicians
21st-century Albanian politicians